Total Nonstop Action Wrestling Special!  was a professional wrestling television special produced by Impact Wrestling, which took place on March 6, 2020 at Coca Cola Roxy in Atlanta, Georgia  on AXS TV.

Background
This television special was originally a set up leading to the TNA: There's No Place Like Home event but the event was cancelled in response to the COVID-19 pandemic.

Results

References

External links
impactwrestling.com

2020 American television episodes
2020 in professional wrestling
2020s American television specials
Events in Atlanta
March 2020 events in the United States